Tuy, officially the Municipality of Tuy,  is a 3rd class municipality in the province of Batangas, Philippines. According to the 2020 census, it has a population of 46,519 people.

The patron of Tuy is Saint Vincent Ferrer, the patron of construction workers, whose feast day is celebrated on May 8.

Tuy is located between Balayan and Nasugbu. It is also situated between 2 rivers: in the north, Tuy town proper's boundary is the Mataywanac/Salipit River, while in the south, the Tuy town proper's boundary is the Obispo River.

Former PNP chief Raul Bacalzo was born in Tuy and is a graduate of Our Lady of Peace Academy's high school department.

Tuy has been producing bakery products of its own, like the jacobina biscuits and biscocho toasted bread, among other bakery products, since the 1960s.

History
Tuy was historically part of the town of Balayan, the former capital of Batangas province. It became an independent town on August 12, 1866. The name "Tuy" was given by Salvador Ellio, the alcalde mayor of Batangas, in memory of his birthplace, Tui, Galicia, Spain. It was then placed under the temporary governance of Balayan from 1903 to 1911.

In the early 2000s, a Batangas gubernatorial candidate was assassinated in Tuy's town plaza, while he was campaigning.

Geography

According to the Philippine Statistics Authority, the municipality has a land area of  constituting  of the  total area of Batangas.

Barangays
Tuy is politically subdivided into 22 barangays.

Climate

Demographics

In the 2020 census, Tuy had a population of 46,519.

Religion

The primary religion in Tuy is Roman Catholicism with a few variations of biblical Christian denominations like evangelicals, and Baptists, among other groups. There are also other religions which include Jehovah's Witnesses, Adventists, and Church of Christ movements.

The main poblacion of Tuy is predominantly followers of Blessed Virgin Mary (Roman Catholic) sporting yearly occasions to its honor. Also the main poblacion houses the Our lady of Peace Academy, a Roman Catholic school.

There are 5 Iglesia ni Cristo chapels in Tuy, known as Guinhawa, Tuy, Sabang, Acle, Silangan.

Economy 

The primary income source of people from Tuy are through agricultural lands like sugarcane farms. Sugarcane harvests in Tuy are usually processed in neighboring towns' factories like Nasugbu and Balayan sporting lower income base in the town of Tuy.

Some also depend on poultry, livestock, and other crops. Most of the population are unemployed or either migrating once employed due to absence of real high-paying job opportunities in its vicinity.

Natural resources

Natural resources available in Tuy include sand, gravel, earth, construction materials, and timber. Sand, earth, & construction materials are found in some rivers with potential quarrying resources, especially riverbanks and watersheds. These are the Tuyon-Tuyon, Palico, Munting Tubig, Kaytitinga, Bayudbud and Molino rivers.

Quarrying of earth is found in hills and mountains while quarrying of rocks is found in Barangay San Jose. Timber is found in the forested areas – portions of Barangays Dalima, Talon, Palincaro, Malibu, Toong, Magahis, and San Jose.

Major agricultural activities/crops

Sugarcane is the major crop, which produces about more than 30,000 metric tons of sugar per milling season. Milling starts during the month of December and usually ends by June of the following year. Land cultivation of sugarcane farms is on a tenancy basis hereby the tenants share 50% of the production cost and obtains 50% of the income. Sugar is harvested, hauled and brought to the nearby sugar milling companies in the towns of Balayan and Nasugbu. Sugarcane farming is thus the main source of livelihood of the people. It also provides employment for cane cutters, weepers, and haulers who are paid either on a daily or per tone of cane basis.

Other major commercial crops are mango (mainly the Indian variety), and cassava. Fruit-bearing trees and vegetable crops are also planted in the fields, backyards, and home gardens to supply household demands, and augment income.

Festivals 
Tuy's original festival was the Salagubang (a kind of root and leaf-eating beetle) Festival. This celebration, however, was discontinued and eventually so replaced due to obvious acceptability reasons by the annual Kambingan (goats and their by-products) Festival.

The Kambingan Festival is the local way of honoring their town, and a town plaza night food market where people can buy foods and enjoy free net-surfing thru Wi-Fi connection.

Inhabitants also celebrate the Mamang-os (sugar cane) Festival for having a good harvest of sugarcane every year.

Infrastructure

Transportation
Land transportation facilities are available in the municipality like public utility jeepneys, light vehicles, trucks, motorcycles, buses, tricycles, trailers, & heavy trucks. Public utility jeepneys are the dominant land transports plying the Balayan-Tuy-Nasugbu routes, and vice versa. Tricycles are the most used public utility that serve the population in different barangays of the municipality. Buses also link the town to Manila and Batangas City.

Bridges

Tuy has eight bridges, all of which are constructed of concrete. Of these eight bridges, six are national, while the other two are provincial.

Communication
The municipality has three telephone systems, as of 2011. One is being operated by Western Batangas Telecommunication System, the other by Digitel, and the other by Globe. A telegraph office dispatches messages thru telegrams. Its office is located at the ground floor of the municipal building together with the post office with one post master, one mail sorter, and two letter carriers who serve the municipality.

As of 2021, cell phones use keep on spreading, as well as the internet connectivities that the same cell phone Service provider offer, namely Globe, PLDT/Smart, and DITO among other telecommunication companies.

Education 

Tuy has no college or tertiary level school and depends mainly on their vocational education system hosted by the municipality.

There are 3 secondary level schools, mainly Jose Lopez Manzano NHS, Our Lady of Peace Academy, Bolboc NHS, Talon Family Farm School, Tuy NHS, I.B. Calingasan Memorial Institute, and Santiago de Guzman NHS.

There are also numerous elementary and pre-elementary schools in Tuy, aside from the ones built mainly for each barangay.

Media
All newspapers, magazines, comics, and other periodicals available in the National Capital Region (NCR) reach the municipality, physically, and through the net, including those available internationally. Likewise, radio, television sets, computer gadgets, and the like in the locality have good and clear receptions of the programs aired in the mass media, and likewise provided in the internet.

References

External links

[ Philippine Standard Geographic Code]

Municipalities of Batangas